is  the former Head coach of the Oita Heat Devils in the Japanese Bj League.

Head coaching record

|- 
| style="text-align:left;"|Oita Heat Devils
| style="text-align:left;"|2010–11
| 39||16||23|||| style="text-align:center;"|Fired|||-||-||-||
| style="text-align:center;"|-
|-

References

1978 births
Living people
Ehime Orange Vikings coaches
North Carolina Tar Heels men's basketball coaches
Stanford Cardinal men's basketball coaches